Ian Warren Mackley  (31 March 1942 – 2 January 2014) was a British diplomat.

Mackley was educated at Ardingly College. He was British Chargé d'Affaires to Afghanistan between 1987 and 1989, and went on to serve as British High Commissioner to Ghana between 1996 and 2000 where he concurrently served as non-resident ambassadors to Togo. He featured in a satirical cartoon strip by Steve Bell in The Guardian when the British mission withdrew from Afghanistan at the time of the Taliban takeover. After retiring from the FCO in 2001, he served as a clerk in the House of Lords.

Honours
  Companion of the Order of St Michael and St George (CMG) – 1989
  Commander of the Royal Victorian Order (CVO) – 1999

References

1942 births
2014 deaths
People educated at Ardingly College
Companions of the Order of St Michael and St George
Commanders of the Royal Victorian Order
High Commissioners of the United Kingdom to Ghana
Ambassadors of the United Kingdom to Togo